The Chief Minister of Malacca is the head of government in the Malaysian state of Malacca. According to convention, the Chief Minister is the leader of the majority party or largest coalition party of the Malacca State Legislative Assembly. The post is currently held by Sulaiman Md Ali, who took office on 9 March 2020.

Appointment
According to the state constitution, the Yang di-Pertua Negeri of Malacca shall first appoint the Chief Minister to preside over the Executive Council and requires such Chief Minister to be a member of the Legislative Assembly who in his judgment is likely to command the confidence of the majority of the members of the Assembly and must be a Malaysian citizen by naturalization or by registration. The Yang di-Pertua Negeri on the Chief Minister's advice shall appoint not more than ten nor less than four members from among the members of the Legislative Assembly.

The member of the Executive Council must take and subscribe in the presence of the Yang di-Pertua Negeri the oath of office and allegiance as well as the oath of secrecy before they can exercise the functions of office. The Executive Council shall be collectively responsible to the Legislative Assembly. The members of the Executive Council shall not hold any office of profit and engage in any trade, business or profession that will cause conflict of interest.

If a government cannot get its appropriation (budget) legislation passed by the Legislative Assembly, or the Legislative Assembly passes a vote of "no confidence" in the government, the Chief Minister is bound by convention to resign immediately. The Yang di-Pertua Negeri's choice of replacement chief minister will be dictated by the circumstances. A member of the Executive Council other than the Chief Minister shall hold office during the pleasure of the Yang di-Pertua Negeri, unless the appointment of any member of the Executive Council shall have been revoked by the Yang di-Pertua Negeri on the advice of the Chief Minister but may at any time resign his office.

Following a resignation in other circumstances, defeated in an election or the death of a chief minister, the Yang di-Pertua Negeri will generally appoint as Chief Minister the person voted by the governing party as their new leader.

Powers
The power of the chief minister is subject to a number of limitations. Chief ministers removed as leader of his or her party, or whose government loses a vote of no confidence in the Legislative Assembly, must advise a state election or resign the office or be dismissed by the Yang di-Pertua Negeri. The defeat of a supply bill (one that concerns the spending of money) or unable to pass important policy-related legislation is seen to require the resignation of the government or dissolution of Legislative Assembly, much like a non-confidence vote, since a government that cannot spend money is hamstrung, also called loss of supply.

The chief minister's party will normally have a majority in the Legislative Assembly and party discipline is exceptionally strong in Malacca politics, so passage of the government's legislation through the Legislative Assembly is mostly a formality.

Caretaker Chief Minister
The legislative assembly unless sooner dissolved by the Yang di-Pertua Negeri with His Excellency's own discretion on the advice of the chief minister shall continue for five years from the date of its first meeting. The state constitution permits a delay of 60 days of general election to be held from the date of dissolution and the legislative assembly shall be summoned to meet on a date not later than 120 days from the date of dissolution. Conventionally, between the dissolution of one legislative assembly and the convening of the next, the chief minister and the executive council remain in office in a caretaker capacity.

List of chief ministers of Malacca
The following is the list of chief ministers of Malacca since 1957:

Colour key (for political parties):
 /

References